Kalraj Mishra (born 1 July 1941) is an Indian politician, serving as the Governor of Rajasthan. He is the former Governor of Himachal Pradesh and Cabinet Minister of Micro, Small and Medium Enterprises in the BJP-led NDA government of Prime Minister Narendra Modi. Being affiliated with the Bharatiya Janata Party (BJP), he was a member of Parliament from Deoria constituency in Uttar Pradesh from 2014 to 2019.

He was a member of Rajya Sabha and a MLA from Lucknow East assembly constituency. He was also President of Uttar Pradesh state unit of the BJP.

He was appointed the Union Minister for Micro, Small and Medium Enterprises (MSME).

Personal life 
Mishra was born on 1 July 1941 as the fourth son in a middle-class family in Malikpur, Ghazipur. His father, Ramagya Mishra, was a teacher. He obtained his M.A. degree from Mahatma Gandhi Kashi Vidyapith, Varanasi. He married Satyawati Mishra on 7 May 1963, with whom he has a son and a daughter.

Political career
In 1955, Mishra became a swayamsevak of RSS and in 1963 became RSS purnkalik pracharak. In 1977, he was vice–president of Janata Yuva Morcha (Youth organisation of Janata Party), with Subramanian Swamy as its president. In 1979, he was elected as President of Janata Yuva Morcha. He was the first elected National President of Bharatiya Janata Yuva Morcha.

He was a three term member of Rajya Sabha in 1978, 2001 and 2006. He entered politics and held many party positions at state and national level. He was a Cabinet Minister in Government of Uttar Pradesh holding the portfolios of Public Works, Medical Education and Tourism during March 1997 – August 2000 period.

Mishra started a campaign wherein all state highways would be made crater free. He played an important role in the formation of Uttarakhand. By his efforts and organisational capability he was able to make a good & competent organisation.

First time ever Mishra contested Vidhan Sabha election in 2012 as a BJP candidate from Lucknow East assembly constituency and won the seat for BJP. He initiated many developmental projects.
In 2014 Mishra became MP from Deoria constituency & later appointed Cabinet Minister in the Modi government. He was the Minister of Micro, Small and Medium Enterprises from 26 May 2014 to 2 September 2017. On 15 July 2019 he was appointed Governor of Himachal Pradesh replacing Acharya Devvrat who was transferred to Gujarat as Governor.

Governorship 
In July 2019, he was appointed the Governor of Himachal Pradesh replacing Acharya Devvrat. In September 2019, he was appointed the Governor of Rajasthan and is presently a governor designate.

References

|-

|-

|-

|-

External links 
 Personal website
 Ministry of Micro, Small and Medium Enterprises

1941 births
Living people
Politicians from Ghazipur
Rajya Sabha members from Uttar Pradesh
State cabinet ministers of Uttar Pradesh
India MPs 2014–2019
Members of the Cabinet of India
Lok Sabha members from Uttar Pradesh
Narendra Modi ministry
Members of the Uttar Pradesh Legislative Assembly
Bharatiya Janata Party politicians from Uttar Pradesh
Bharatiya Jana Sangh politicians
Governors of Himachal Pradesh
Janata Party politicians